Mockery is a form of mocking derision.

Mockery may also refer to:
Mockery (1912 film), an American short silent film
Mockery (1927 film), an American film about the Russian Revolution

See also 
Mock (disambiguation)